Aitana may refer to:
 Aitana (mountain), Valencian Community, Spain
 Aitana (singer), Spanish singer
 Aitana FC, East Timor football club